DANTE is Taiwanese Mandopop artist Show Lo's first Japanese single album. It was released on 15 February 2012 in Japan by Pony Canyon, and on 2 March 2012 in Taiwan by Gold Typhoon (Taiwan).

Track listing

Music videos

References

External links
  Show Lo discography @ Pony Canyon
  羅志祥 官方專屬頻道 Show's Official Youtube Channel

2013 albums
Show Lo albums
Sony Music albums